Éric Buffetaut (born 19 November 1950) is a French paleontologist, author and researcher at the Centre national de la recherche scientifique since 1976 where he is a Doctor of Science and Director of Research. Buffetaut is a specialist of fossil archosaurs, mainly dinosaurs and pterosaurs, and has published many books on paleontology. He is one of the major paleontologists to support the thesis of the fall of a meteorite as the main cause of the Cretaceous–Paleogene extinction event.

Notable works 
Buffetaut named and described the following species:

 Archaeodontosaurus descouensi
 Euthecodon arambourgi
 Isanosaurus attavipachi
 Isalorhynchus genovefae
 Kinnareemimus khonkaenensis
 Normannognathus wellnhoferi
 Phuwiangosaurus sirindhornae
 Psittacosaurus sattayaraki
 Rhabdodon septimanicus
 Siamamia naga
 Siamosaurus suteethorni
 Siamotyrannus isanensis
 Tarascosaurus salluvicus
 Tilemsisuchus lavocati
 Trematochampsa taqueti
 Variraptor mechinorum

Buffetaut demonstrated in 1982 that Dakosaurus and Aggiosaurus are actually Metriorhynchidae.

Musturzabalsuchus buffetauti was named in his honor.

Buffeataut worked mainly with Mesozoic reptiles including crocodylomorphs, pterosaurs and dinosaurs.

Selected publications 
 Les Dinosaures. Que sais-je ? n°2827, PUF, 1994 
 Les Dinosaures de France, avec Pascal Robin, BRGM Éditions 1995 
 Histoire de la paléontologie. Que sais-je ? n°2190, PUF, avril 1997 
 Les Mondes disparus, atlas de la dérive des continents, avec Jean Le Loeuff, Guy Le Roux, Berg International, 1998 	
 Dans les traces des dinosaures, Les Éditions Pocket 
 La Fin des dinosaures : comment les grandes extinctions ont façonné le monde vivant., Fayard, 2003 
 Les Dinosaures. Collection "Idées reçues n°123. Éditions Le Cavalier Bleu, 2006 
 Les dinosaures sont-ils un échec de l'évolution ?. Éditions du Pommier, 2008 
 Que nous racontent les fossiles ?, éditions du Pommier, 2009 
 Sommes-nous tous voués à disparaître ? idées reçues sur l'extinction des espèces, Éditions Le Cavalier Bleu, 2012, 
 À la recherche des animaux mystérieux : idées reçues sur la cryptozoologie, Le Cavalier Bleu éditions, 2016,

References 

1950 births
Textbook writers
Living people
French paleontologists
People from Eure